WCYO (100.7 FM) is a radio station  broadcasting a country music format. Licensed to Irvine, Kentucky, United States, the station serves Richmond and surrounding communities, including parts of the Lexington metropolitan area.  The station is currently owned by Wallingford Communications.

History
The station was issued the callsign WCYO on April 5, 1991.

Sports programming
100.7 The Coyote is the flagship station for Eastern Kentucky University Colonels sports.

References

External links

CYOu
Estill County, Kentucky